Jerry Lewis (born Joseph Levitch; March 16, 1926 – August 20, 2017) was an American comedian, actor, singer, filmmaker, and humanitarian. As his contributions to comedy and charity made him a global figure in pop culture, Lewis was nicknamed "The King of Comedy". 

Starting in 1946, he teamed with singer Dean Martin to form the famous comedy duo Martin and Lewis, then in 1956, went on as a headlining stage act, top-grossing movie star, a staple on television, singer/recording artist and filmmaker.

He was an early and prominent user of video assist, which allows real-time review of how a scene looks on camera. As national chairman of the Muscular Dystrophy Association (MDA), Lewis supported fundraising for muscular dystrophy research and hosted The Jerry Lewis Telethon.

Lewis starred in 60 movies and directed 13 films.

Early life
Lewis was born on March 16, 1926, in Newark, New Jersey, to a Jewish family. His parents were Daniel "Danny" Levitch (1902–1980), a master of ceremonies and vaudevillian who performed under the stage name Danny Lewis, whose parents immigrated to the United States from the Russian Empire to New York, and Rachael "Rae" Levitch (née Brodsky; 1903–1983), a WOR radio pianist and Danny's music director, from Warsaw. Reports about his birth name are conflicting; in Lewis's 1982 autobiography, he claimed his birth name was Joseph, after his maternal grandfather, but his birth certificate, the 1930 U. S. Census, and the 1940 U. S. Census all named him as Jerome.

Reports about the hospital where he was born conflict as well; biographer Shawn Levy claims Lewis was born at Clinton Private Hospital and others report it as Newark Beth Israel Hospital. Other aspects of his early life conflict with accounts made by family members, burial records, and vital records.

In his teenage years, Lewis was known for pulling pranks in his neighborhood, including sneaking into kitchens to steal fried chicken and pies. He dropped out of Irvington High School in the tenth grade. Lewis said that he ceased using the names Joseph and Joey as an adult to avoid being confused with Joe E. Lewis and Joe Louis.

Early career
By age 15, Lewis had developed his "Record Act", miming lyrics to songs while a phonograph played offstage. He landed a gig at a burlesque house in Buffalo, but his performance fell flat and he was unable to book anymore shows. To make ends meet, Lewis worked as a soda jerk and a theater usher for Suzanne Pleshette's father Gene at the Paramount Theatre as well as at Loew's Capitol Theatre, both in New York City.

A veteran burlesque comedian, Max Coleman, who had worked with Lewis's father years before, persuaded him to try again. Irving Kaye, a Borscht Belt comedian, saw Lewis's mime act at Brown's Hotel in Loch Sheldrake, New York, the following summer, and the audience was so enthusiastic that Kaye became Lewis's manager and guardian for Borscht Belt appearances. 

During World War II, Lewis was rejected from military service because of a heart murmur.

Career

Teaming with Dean Martin

In 1945, Lewis was 19 when he met 27-year-old singer Dean Martin at the Glass Hat Club in New York City, where the two performed until they debuted at Atlantic City's 500 Club as Martin and Lewis on July 25, 1946. The duo gained attention as a double act with Martin serving as the straight man to Lewis's zany antics. The inclusion of ad-libbed improvisational segments in their planned routines added a unique quality to their act and separated them from previous comedy duos.

Martin and Lewis quickly rose to national prominence, first with their popular nightclub act, then as stars of their radio program The Martin and Lewis Show. The two made their television debut on CBS' Toast of the Town (later renamed as The Ed Sullivan Show) June 20, 1948. This was followed by an appearance on Welcome Aboard on October 3, 1948, and by a guest stint on Texaco Star Theater in 1949.

In 1950, they signed with NBC to be one of a series of weekly rotating hosts of The Colgate Comedy Hour, a live Sunday evening broadcast. Lewis, writer for the team's nightclub act, hired Norman Lear and Ed Simmons as regular writers for their Comedy Hour material. Their Comedy Hour shows consisted of stand-up dialogue, song and dance from their nightclub act and movies, backed by Dick Stabile's big band, slapstick and satirical sketch comedy, Martin's solo songs, and Lewis's solo pantomimes or physical numbers.

Martin and Lewis often broke character, ad-libbing and breaking the fourth wall. While not completely capturing the orchestrated mayhem of their nightclub act, the Comedy Hour displayed charismatic energy between the team and established their popularity nationwide. By 1951, with an appearance at the Paramount Theatre in New York, they were a hit. The duo began their film careers at Paramount Pictures as ensemble players, in My Friend Irma (1949) and its sequel My Friend Irma Goes West (1950). 

They then starred in their own series of 14 new films, At War with the Army (1950), That's My Boy (1951), Sailor Beware (1952), Jumping Jacks (1952), The Stooge (1952), Scared Stiff (1953), The Caddy (1953), Money from Home (1953), Living It Up (1954), 3 Ring Circus (1954), You're Never Too Young (1955), Artists and Models (1955), Pardners (1956) and Hollywood or Bust (1956), all produced by Hal B. Wallis and appeared on Bing Crosby and Bob Hope's Olympic Fund Telethon.

Martin and Lewis cameoed in Bob Hope and Bing Crosby's film Road to Bali (1952), then Hope and Crosby would do the same in Scared Stiff a year later. Attesting to the duo's popularity, DC Comics published The Adventures of Dean Martin and Jerry Lewis from 1952 to 1957. The team appeared on What's My Line? in 1954, the 27th annual Academy Awards in 1955, The Steve Allen Show and The Today Show in 1956.

Their films were popular with audiences and were financial successes for Paramount. In later years, both Lewis and Martin admitted frustration with Wallis for his formulaic and trite film choices, restricting them to narrow, repetitive roles. As Martin's roles in their films became less important over time and Lewis received the majority of critical acclaim, the partnership came under strain. Martin's participation became an embarrassment in 1954 when Look magazine published a publicity photo of the team for the magazine cover but cropped Martin out.

After their final nightclub act on July 24, 1956, both Lewis and Martin went on to have successful solo careers, but neither would comment on the split nor consider a reunion. They were occasionally seen at the same public events and even reunited on stage for 15 minutes to do their old act together in 1960 at The Sands hotel.Dean surprised Jerry on his appearance on The Eddie Fisher Show on September 30, 1958, and they appeared on TV together at the 1959 Academy Awards closing. They reunited several times publicly, and sometimes privately according to interviews they gave to magazines.

Twenty years after their breakup, Frank Sinatra surprised Lewis by bringing Martin onstage during the Jerry Lewis Telethon in September 1976. In 1989, Lewis returned the gesture, attending Martin's 72nd birthday.

Solo period
After ending his partnership with Martin in 1956, Lewis and his wife Patty took a vacation in Las Vegas to consider the direction of his career. He felt his life was in a crisis state: "I was unable to put one foot in front of the other with any confidence. I was completely unnerved to be alone". While there, he received an urgent request from his friend Sid Luft, who was Judy Garland's husband and manager, saying that she couldn't perform that night in Las Vegas because of strep throat, and asking Lewis to fill in.

Lewis had not sung alone on stage since he was five years old, twenty-five years before. He delivered jokes and clowned with the audience while Garland sat off-stage, watching. He then sang a rendition of a song he'd learned as a child, "Rock-a-Bye Your Baby with a Dixie Melody" along with "Come Rain or Come Shine". Lewis recalled, "When I was done, the place exploded. I walked off the stage knowing I could make it on my own".

At his wife's urging, Lewis used his own money to record the songs on a single. Decca Records heard it, liked it and insisted he record an album for them. The single of Rock-a-Bye Your Baby went to No. 10 and the album Jerry Lewis Just Sings went to No. 3 on the Billboard charts, staying near the top for four months and selling a million and a half copies.

With the success of that album, he recorded the additional albums More Jerry Lewis (an EP of songs from this release was released as Somebody Loves Me), and Jerry Lewis Sings Big Songs for Little People (later reissued with fewer tracks as Jerry Lewis Sings for Children). Non-album singles were released, and It All Depends On You hit the charts in April and May 1957, but peaked at only No. 68. Further singles were recorded and released by Lewis into the mid-1960s.

But these were not Lewis's first forays into recording, nor his first appearance on the hit charts. During his partnership with Martin, they made several recordings together, charting at No. 22 in 1948 with the 1920s That Certain Party and later mostly re-recording songs highlighted in their films. Also during the time of their partnership, but without Martin, he recorded numerous novelty-comedy numbers for adults as well as records specifically intended for the children's market.

In late 1956, Lewis began performing regularly at the Sands Hotel and Casino in Las Vegas, which marked a turning point in his life and career. The Sands signed him for five years to perform six weeks each year and paid him the same amount they had paid Martin and Lewis as a team. The critics gave him positive reviews: "Jerry was wonderful. He has proved that he can be a success by himself," wrote one. He continued with club performances in Miami, New York, Chicago and Washington.

Live performances became a staple of Lewis' career and over the years he performed at casinos, theaters, and state fairs. In February 1957, Lewis followed Garland at the Palace Theater in New York and Martin called on the phone during this period to wish him the best of luck. "I've never been happier," said Lewis. "I have peace of mind for the first time." 

Lewis established himself as a solo act on TV starting with the first of six appearances on What's My Line? from 1956 to 1966 and then guest starred on The Tennessee Ernie Ford Show. He appeared on both Tonight Starring Jack Paar and The Ed Sullivan Show and beginning in January 1957, in a number of solo TV specials for NBC. He starred in his adaptation of "The Jazz Singer" for Startime. Lewis hosted the Academy Awards three times, in 1956, 1957 and the 31st Academy Awards in 1959, which ran twenty minutes short, forcing Lewis to improvise to fill time. DC Comics published a new comic book series titled The Adventures of Jerry Lewis, running from 1957 to 1971.

Lewis remained at Paramount and started off with his first solo effort The Delicate Delinquent (1957) then starred in his next film The Sad Sack (1957). Frank Tashlin, whose background as a Looney Tunes cartoon director suited Lewis's brand of humor, came on board. Lewis did new films with him, first with Rock-A-Bye Baby (1958) and then The Geisha Boy (1958). Billy Wilder asked Lewis to play the lead role of an uptight jazz musician named Jerry, who winds up on the run from the mob in Some Like It Hot, but he turned the role down.

Lewis then appeared in Don't Give Up The Ship (1959) and made a cameo appearance in Li'l Abner (1959).  A 1959 contract between Paramount and Jerry Lewis Productions specified a payment of $10 million plus 60% of the profits for 14 films over seven years.

This contract made Lewis the highest paid individual Hollywood talent to date and was unprecedented in that he had unlimited creative control, including final cut and the return of film rights after 30 years. Lewis's clout and box office were so strong (his films had already earned Paramount $100 million in rentals) that Barney Balaban, head of production at Paramount at that time, told the press, "If Jerry wants to burn down the studio I'll give him the match!"

Lewis had finished his film contract with Wallis with Visit to a Small Planet (1960) and wrapped up production on his own film Cinderfella (1960), directed by Tashlin and was postponed for a Christmas 1960 release. Paramount Pictures, needing a quickie movie for its summer 1960 schedule, held Lewis to his contract to produce one. As a result, he made his debut as film director of The Bellboy (1960), which he also starred in.

Using the Fontainebleau Hotel in Miami as his setting — on a small budget, with a very tight shooting schedule — Lewis shot the film during the day and performed at the hotel in the evenings. Bill Richmond collaborated with him on many of the sight gags. Lewis later revealed that Paramount was not happy about financing a "silent movie" and withdrew backing. Lewis used his own funds to cover the movie's $950,000 budget. Meanwhile, he directed an unsold pilot for Permanent Waves.

Lewis continued to direct more films that he had co-written with Richmond, including The Ladies Man (1961), where Lewis constructed a three-story dollhouse-like set spanning two sound stages, with the set equipped with state of the art lighting and sound, eliminating the need for boom mics in each room and his next movie The Errand Boy (1961), was one of the earliest films about movie-making, using all of the Paramount backlot and offices.

Lewis appeared in The Wacky World of Jerry Lewis, Celebrity Golf, The Garry Moore Show and Tashlin's It's Only Money (1962), then guest hosted The Tonight Show during the transition from Jack Paar to Johnny Carson in 1962 and his appearance on the show scored the highest ratings thus far in late night, surpassing other guest hosts and Paar. The three major networks began a bidding war, wooing Lewis for his own talk show, which debuted the following year.

Lewis then directed, co-wrote and starred in the smash hit The Nutty Professor (1963). A parody of Dr. Jekyll and Mr. Hyde, it featured him as Professor Kelp, a socially inept scientist who invents a serum that turns him into a handsome but obnoxious ladies man. It is often considered to be Lewis's best film. It was selected for preservation in the National Film Registry in 2004. The film inspired a franchise, which has included a 1996 remake starring Eddie Murphy in the title role and a stage musical adaptation.

In 1963, he had a cameo role in It's a Mad, Mad, Mad, Mad World (1963) and fully starred in Tashlin's Who's Minding the Store? (1963).  He also hosted The Jerry Lewis Show, a lavish 13-week, big-budget show which aired on ABC from September to December in 1963.

Lewis next starred in The Patsy (1964), his satire about the Hollywood star-making industry, The Disorderly Orderly (1964), his final collaboration with Tashlin, appeared in a cameo on The Joey Bishop Show and The Family Jewels (1965) about a young heiress who must choose among six uncles, one of whom is up to no good and out to harm the girl's beloved bodyguard who practically raised her. All six uncles and the bodyguard were played by Lewis.

In 1965, Lewis was interviewed on The David Susskind Show, then starred in Boeing Boeing (1965), his last film for Paramount, based on the French stage play, in which he received a Golden Globe nomination; an episode of Ben Casey, an early dramatic role; The Andy Williams Show; and Hullabaloo with his son Gary Lewis. In 1966, after 17 years, and with no explanation, Lewis left Paramount and signed with Columbia Pictures where he tried to reinvent himself with more serious roles.

He went on to star in Three on a Couch (1966), The Merv Griffin Show, Way...Way Out (1966), The Sammy Davis Jr. Show, Batman, Laugh In, Password, a pilot for Sheriff Who, a new version of The Jerry Lewis Show, this time as a one-hour variety show for NBC, which ran from 1967 to 1969, The Big Mouth (1967), Run for Your Life and The Danny Thomas Hour.

Lewis appeared in Don't Raise the Bridge, Lower the River (1968), Playboy After Dark (surprising friend Sammy Davis Jr.), Hook, Line & Sinker (1969), Jimmy Durante's The Lennon Sisters Hour, The Red Skelton Show and The Jack Benny Birthday Special and contributed to some scripts for Filmation's animated series Will the Real Jerry Lewis Please Sit Down, appeared on The Mike Douglas Show and directed an episode of The Bold Ones.

Lewis guested on The Sonny & Cher Comedy Hour, The Hollywood Palace, The Engelbert Humperdinck Show, The Irv Kupcinet Show, The Linkletter Show, The Real Tom Kennedy Show and A Christmas Night with the Stars, directed One More Time (1970), in which he played his first (and only) off-screen voice as a bandleader, starred in Which Way to the Front? (1970) and appeared on The Carol Burnett Show, The Rolf Harris Show and The Kraft Music Hall.

Lewis directed and appeared in the partly unreleased The Day the Clown Cried (1972), a drama set in a Nazi concentration camp. The film was rarely discussed by Lewis, but he said that litigation over post-production finances and copyright prevented its completion and theatrical release. During his book tour for Dean and Me, he also said a factor for the film's burial was that he was not proud of the effort.

Lewis explained his reason for choosing the project and the emotional difficulty of the subject matter in an interview with an Australian documentary film crew. A 31-minute edited compilation of the film's scenes was compiled by Lewis fan Kay Brown/Donazify, and went viral on the internet in 2016, after the footage was shown on the German television station ARD, in the documentary Der Clown. It was later put on DVD and shown at Deutsches Filminstitute. The film was the earliest attempt by an American film director to address the subject of The Holocaust. Significant speculation continues to surround the film. Following this, Lewis took a break from the movie business for several years.

Lewis appeared as guest on Good Morning America, The Dick Cavett Show, NBC Follies, Celebrity Sportsman, Cher, Dinah! and Tony Orlando and Dawn. Lewis surprised Sinatra and Martin after walking onto the Aladdin stage in Las Vegas during their show and exchanged jokes for several minutes. He then starred in a revival of Hellzapoppin with Lynn Redgrave, but closed on the road before reaching Broadway. In 1979, he guest hosted as ringmaster of Circus of the Stars.

Lewis guest starred on Pink Lady in 1980, then made a comeback to the big screen in Hardly Working (1981), after an 11-year absence from film. Despite being panned by critics, it eventually earned $50 million. In 1982 and 1983, Lewis appeared on Late Night with David Letterman and in The King of Comedy, as a late-night TV host, plagued by two obsessive fans, in which he received wide critical acclaim and a BAFTA nomination for this serious dramatic role.

Lewis then starred in Saturday Night Live, Star Search, Cracking Up (1983), Slapstick (Of Another Kind) (1984), To Catch a Cop (1984) and How Did You Get In? We Didn't See You Leave (1984), the latter two films from France which had their distribution under Lewis's control and stated that they would never be released in American movie theaters and on home media. He then was a guest on an episode of The Tonight Show Starring Johnny Carson.

He then hosted a new syndicated version of The Jerry Lewis Show, this time as a talk show for Metromedia, which was not continued beyond the scheduled five shows. In 1985, Lewis directed an episode of Brothers, appeared at the first Comic Relief in 1986, where he was the only performer to receive a standing ovation, was interviewed on Classic Treasures and starred in the ABC television movie Fight for Life (1987).

In 1987, Lewis performed a second double act with Davis Jr. at Bally's in Las Vegas, then after learning of the death of Martin's son Dean Paul Martin, he attended his funeral, which led to a more substantial reconciliation with Martin. In 1988, Lewis hosted America's All-Time Favorite Movies, then was interviewed by Howard Cosell on Speaking of Everything. He then starred in five episodes of Wiseguy.

The filming schedule of the show forced Lewis to miss the Museum of the Moving Image's opening with a retrospective of his work. In 1989, Lewis joined Martin on stage, for what would be Martin's final live performance, at Bally's Hotel and Casino in Las Vegas. Lewis wheeled out a cake on Martin's 72nd birthday, sang "Happy Birthday" to him and joked, "Why we broke up, I'll never know". He next appeared in Cookie (1989).

Lewis handled two years directing episodes of Super Force and  Good Grief in 1990 and 1991, then star in Mr. Saturday Night (1992), The Arsenio Hall Show, The Whoopi Goldberg Show and Inside The Comedy Mind. A three-part retrospective Martin & Lewis: Their Golden Age of Comedy, aired on The Disney Channel in 1992, using previously unseen kinescopes from Lewis's personal archive, highlighted his years as part of a team with Martin and as a soloist.

After guest spots on Mad About You and Larry King Live and film appearances in Arizona Dream (1993) and Funny Bones (1995), Lewis made his Broadway debut, as a replacement cast member playing the devil, in a revival of Damn Yankees and was reportedly paid the highest sum in Broadway history at the time for performing in both the national and London runs of the musical. He missed only three shows in more than four years, one of those occasions being the funeral of Martin, his comedy partner of ten years.

Lewis appeared on Inside the Actors Studio in 1996, the 12th annual American Comedy Awards in 1998, The Martin Short Show, Russell Gilbert Live, The Simpsons, Late Night with Conan O'Brien, Live with Kelly, Law & Order: Special Victims Unit, the song "Time After Time" with Deana Martin on her album Memories Are Made of This and Curious George 2: Follow That Monkey! (2009).

He made his last appearances for the 81st Academy Awards, Till Luck Do Us Part 2 (2013), The Talk, The Tonight Show Starring Jimmy Fallon, The World Over with Raymond Arroyo, The Trust (2016), his final film Max Rose (2016), WTF with Marc Maron and Comedians in Cars Getting Coffee.

Video assist and film class
During the 1960 production of The Bellboy, Lewis pioneered the technique of using video cameras and multiple closed circuit monitors, which allowed him to review his performance instantly. This was necessary since he was acting as well as directing. His techniques and methods of filmmaking, documented in his book and his USC class, enabled him to complete most of his films on time and under budget since reshoots could take place immediately instead of waiting for the dailies.

Man in Motion, a featurette for Three on a Couch, features the video system, named "Jerry's Noisy Toy" and shows Lewis receiving the Golden Light Technical Achievement award for its development. Lewis stated he worked with the head of Sony to produce the prototype. While he initiated its practice and use, and was instrumental in its development, he did not hold a patent. This practice is now commonplace in filmmaking.

Starting in 1967, Lewis taught a film directing class at the University of Southern California in Los Angeles for a number of years. His students included George Lucas, whose friend Steven Spielberg sometimes sat in on classes.  Lewis screened Spielberg's early film Amblin' and told his students, "That's what filmmaking is all about." The class covered all topics related to filmmaking, including pre and post production, marketing and distribution and filming comedy with rhythm and timing. His 1971 book The Total Film Maker, was based on 480 hours of his class lectures.

Seminars and promotion with Medtronic
Lewis traveled to medical schools for seminars on laughter and healing with Dr. Clifford Kuhn and also did corporate and college lectures, motivational speaking and promoted the pain-treatment company Medtronic.

Acclaim and exposure in France
While Lewis was popular in France for his duo films with Dean Martin and his solo comedy films, his reputation and stature increased after the Paramount contract, when he began to exert total control over all aspects of his films. His involvement in directing, writing, editing and art direction coincided with the rise of auteur theory in French intellectual film criticism and the French New Wave movement. He earned consistent praise from French critics in the influential magazines Cahiers du Cinéma and Positif, where he was hailed as an ingenious auteur.

His singular mise-en-scène, and skill behind the camera, were aligned with Howard Hawks, Alfred Hitchcock and Satyajit Ray. Appreciated too, was the complexity of his also being in front of the camera. The new French criticism viewed cinema as an art form unto itself, and comedy as part of this art. Lewis is then fitted into a historical context and seen as not only worthy of critique, but as an innovator and satirist of his time. Jean-Pierre Coursodon states in a 1975 Film Comment article, "The merit of the French critics, auteurist excesses notwithstanding, was their willingness to look at what Lewis was doing as a filmmaker for what it was, rather than with some preconception of what film comedy should be."

Not yet curricula at universities or art schools, film studies and film theory were avant-garde in early 1960s America. Mainstream movie reviewers such as Pauline Kael, were dismissive of auteur theory, and others, seeing only absurdist comedy, criticized Lewis for his ambition and "castigated him for his self-indulgence" and egotism. Despite this criticism often being held by American film critics, admiration for Lewis and his comedy continued to grow in France.

Appreciation of Lewis became a misunderstood stereotype about "the French", and it was often the object of jokes in American pop culture. "That Americans can't see Jerry Lewis's genius is bewildering," says N. T. Binh, a French film magazine critic. Such bewilderment was the basis of the book Why the French Love Jerry Lewis. In response to the lingering perception that French audiences adored him, Lewis stated in interviews he was more popular in Germany, Japan and Australia.

Muscular dystrophy cause and criticism
As a humanitarian, philanthropist and "number one volunteer", Lewis supported fundraising for research into muscular dystrophy. In 1951, he and Martin made their first appeal for the Muscular Dystrophy Association (simply known as MDA and formerly as the Muscular Dystrophy Associations of America and MDAA) in early December on the finale of The Colgate Comedy Hour. In 1952, after another appeal, Lewis hosted New York area telethons until 1959 and in 1954, fought Rocky Marciano in a boxing bout for MDA's fund drive.

After being named national chairman in 1956, Lewis began hosting The Jerry Lewis MDA Labor Day Telethon in 1966 and aired every Labor Day weekend for six decades. Ed McMahon, announcer of The Tonight Show Starring Johnny Carson and host of Star Search, began his involvement in the telecast in 1968, before coanchoring with Lewis from 1973 to 2008. The show originated from different locations including New York, Las Vegas and Hollywood, becoming the most successful fundraising event in the history of television.  The songs "Smile" (by Charlie Chaplin), "What the World Needs Now Is Love" (by Jackie DeShannon) and "You'll Never Walk Alone" (by Rodgers and Hammerstein) have been used for the telethon's intro, tote board totals and outro.

It was the first to: raise over $1 million, in 1966; be shown entirely in color, in 1967; become a networked telethon, in 1968; go coast-to-coast, in 1970; be seen outside the continental U.S., in 1972. It: raised the largest sum ever in a single event for humanitarian purposes, in 1974; had the greatest amount ever pledged to a televised charitable event, in 1980 (from the Guinness Book of World Records); was the first to be seen by 100 million people, in 1985; celebrated its 25th anniversary, in 1990; saw its highest pledge in history, in 1992; and was the first seen worldwide via internet simulcast, in 1998.

By 1990, societal views of disabled individuals and the telethon format had shifted. Lewis' and the telethon's methods were criticized by disabled-rights activists who believed the show was "designed to evoke pity rather than empower the disabled". The activists said the telethon perpetuated prejudices and stereotypes, that Lewis treated those he claimed to be helping with little respect, and that he used offensive language when describing them.

Lewis rebutted the criticism and defended his methods saying, "If you don't tug at their heartstrings, then you're on the air for nothing."
 The activist protests represented a very small minority of countless MDA patients and clients who had directly benefitted from Lewis's MDA fundraising.  During Lewis' lifetime, MDA-funded scientists discovered the causes of most of the diseases in the Muscular Dystrophy Association's program, developing treatments, therapies and standards of care that have allowed many people living with these diseases to live longer and grow stronger. Over 200 research and treatment facilities were built with donations raised by the Jerry Lewis telethons.

In December 1996, Lewis and MDA were recognized by the American Medical Association with Lifetime Achievement awards for significant and lasting contributions to the health and welfare of humanity.  Lewis received a Nobel Peace Prize nomination in 1977, a Governors Award in 2005 and the Jean Hersholt Humanitarian Award in 2009, in recognition of his fight and efforts with MDA.  His motto summed up the philosophy behind his years of devotion to MDA: "I shall pass through this world but once. Any good, therefore, that I can do or any kindness that I can show to any human being, let me do it now. Let me not defer nor neglect it, for I shall not pass this way again".

2010 would be Lewis' final hosted telethon.  On August 3, 2011, MDA announced that Lewis would no longer host its telethons and that he was no longer associated with MDA. A tribute to Lewis was held during the 2011 telethon (which originally was to be his final show bearing his name with MDA). In May 2015, MDA said it was discontinuing its telethon in view of "the new realities of television viewing and philanthropic giving".

In early 2016, at MDA's brand relaunch event at Carnegie Hall in New York City, Lewis broke a five-year silence during a special taped message for the organization on its website, marking his first (and as it turned out, his final) appearance in support of MDA since his final telethon in 2010 and the end of his tenure as national chairman in 2011.  MDA's website states, "Jerry's love, passion and brilliance are woven throughout this organization, which he helped build from the ground up, courted sponsors for MDA, appeared at openings of MDA care and research centers, addressed meetings of civic organizations, volunteers and the MDA Board of Directors, successfully lobbied Congress for federal neuromuscular disease research funds, made countless phone calls and visits to families served by MDA.

Non-career activities
Lewis opened a camera shop in 1950. In 1969, he agreed to lend his name to "Jerry Lewis Cinemas", offered by National Cinema Corporation as a franchise business opportunity for those interested in theatrical movie exhibition. Jerry Lewis Cinemas stated that their theaters could be operated by a staff of as few as two with the aid of automation and support provided by the franchiser in booking film and other aspects of film exhibition. A forerunner of the smaller rooms typical of later multi-screen complexes, a Jerry Lewis Cinema was billed in franchising ads as a "mini-theatre" with a seating capacity of between 200 and 350.

In addition to Lewis's name, each Jerry Lewis Cinema bore a sign with a cartoon logo of Lewis in profile. Initially 158 territories were franchised, with a buy-in fee of $10,000 or $15,000 depending on the territory, for what was called an "individual exhibitor". For $50,000, Jerry Lewis Cinemas offered an opportunity known as an "area directorship", in which investors controlled franchising opportunities in a territory as well as their own cinemas. The success of the chain was hampered by a policy of only booking second-run, family-friendly films. Eventually the policy was changed, and the Jerry Lewis Cinemas were allowed to show more competitive movies. But after a decade the chain failed and both Lewis and National Cinema Corporation declared bankruptcy in 1980.

In 1973, Lewis appeared on the 1st annual 20-hour Highway Safety Foundation telethon, hosted by Davis Jr. and Monty Hall. In 1990, Lewis wrote and directed a short film for UNICEF's How Are The Children? anthology exploring the rights of children worldwide. The eight-minute segment, titled Boy, was about a young white child in a black world and being subjected to quiet, insidious racism, and outright racist bullying.

In 2010, Lewis met with seven-year-old Lochie Graham, who shared his idea for "Jerry's House", a place for vulnerable and traumatized children. Lewis and Graham entered into a joint partnership for an Australian and a U.S.-based charity and began raising funds to build the facility in Melbourne. On September 12, 2016, Lewis lent his name and star power to Criss Angel's HELP (Heal Every Life Possible) charity event.

Political views
Lewis kept a low political profile for many years, having taken advice reportedly given to him by President John F. Kennedy, who told him, "Don't get into anything political. Don't do that because they will usurp your energy." Nevertheless, he campaigned and performed on behalf of both JFK and Robert F. Kennedy, and was a supporter of the civil rights movement. For his 1957 NBC special, Lewis held his ground when southern affiliates objected to his friendship with Sammy Davis, Jr. In a 1971 Movie Mirror magazine article, Lewis spoke out against the Vietnam War when his son Gary returned from service traumatized. He vowed to leave the country rather than send another of his sons.

Lewis observed that political speeches should not be at the Oscars. He stated, "I think we are the most dedicated industry in the world. And I think that we have to present ourselves that night as hard-working, caring and important people to the industry. We need to get more self-respect as an industry".  In a 2004 interview with The Guardian, Lewis was asked what he was least proud of, to which he answered, "Politics".

He mocked citizens' lack of pride in their country, stating, "President Bush is my president. I will not say anything negative about the president of the United States. I don't do that. And I don't allow my children to do that. Likewise when I come to England don't you do any jokes about 'Mum' to me. That is the Queen of England, you moron. Do you know how tough a job it is to be the Queen of England?"

In a December 2015 interview on EWTN's World Over with Raymond Arroyo, Lewis expressed opposition to the United States letting in Syrian refugees, saying, "No one has worked harder for the human condition than I have, but they're not part of the human condition if 11 guys in that group of 10,000 are ISIS. How can I take that chance?" In the same interview, he criticized President Barack Obama for not being prepared for ISIS, while expressing support for Donald Trump, saying he would make a good president because he was a good "showman". He also added that he admired Ronald Reagan's presidency.

Controversies
In 1998, at the Aspen U.S. Comedy Arts Festival, when asked which women comics he admired, Lewis answered, "I don't like any female comedians. A woman doing comedy doesn't offend me but sets me back a bit.  I, as a viewer, have trouble with it. I think of her as a producing machine that brings babies in the world."

He went on to praise Lucille Ball as "brilliant" and said Carol Burnett is "the greatest female entrepreneur of comedy". On other occasions Lewis expressed admiration for female comedians Totie Fields, Phyllis Diller, Kathleen Freeman, Elayne Boosler, Whoopi Goldberg and Tina Fey. During the 2007 MDA Telethon, Lewis used the slur "fag" in a joke, for which he apologized. Lewis used the same word the following year on Australian television.

Personal life

Relationships and children
Lewis wed Patti Palmer (née Esther Grace Calonico; 1921–2021), a singer with Ted Fio Rito, on October 3, 1944. They had six sons together; five biological: Gary (born 1945), Scott (born 1956), Christopher (born 1957), Anthony (born 1959) and Joseph (1964–2009); and one adopted: Ronald (born 1949). It was an interfaith marriage; Lewis was Jewish and Palmer was Catholic.

He openly pursued relationships with other women and gave unapologetic interviews about his infidelity, revealing his affairs with Marilyn Monroe and Marlene Dietrich to People in 2011. Palmer filed for divorce from Lewis in 1980, after 35 years of marriage, citing Lewis's extravagant spending and infidelity on his part, and it was finalized in 1983. All of Lewis's children and grandchildren from his marriage to Palmer were excluded from inheriting any part of his estate. His eldest son, Gary, publicly called his father a "mean and evil person" and said that Lewis never showed him or his siblings any love or care.

Lewis's second wife was Sandra "SanDee" Pitnick, a University of North Carolina School of the Arts professionally trained ballerina and stewardess, who met Lewis after winning a bit part in a dancing scene on his film Hardly Working. They wed on February 13, 1983, in Key Biscayne, Florida, adopted a daughter, Danielle (born 1992), and were married for 34 years until Lewis' death.

Stalking incident
In February 1994, a man named Gary Benson was revealed to have been stalking Lewis and his family. Benson subsequently served four years in prison.

Sexual assault allegations 
In February 2022, Vanity Fair reported that several of Lewis' co-stars from the 1960s had come forward to share experiences of sexual assault, harassment, and verbal abuse. Those whose accounts were made public included Karen Sharpe, Hope Holiday, Anna Maria Alberghetti, and Lainie Kazan.

Illness and death
Lewis suffered from a number of chronic health problems, illnesses and addictions related both to aging and a back injury sustained in a comedic pratfall. The fall has been stated as being either from a piano while performing at the Sands Hotel and Casino on the Las Vegas Strip on March 20, 1965, or during an appearance on The Andy Williams Show. In its aftermath, Lewis became addicted to the painkiller Percodan for thirteen years. He said he had been off the drug since 1978. In April 2002, Lewis had a Medtronic "Synergy" neurostimulator implanted in his back, which helped reduce the discomfort. He was one of the company's leading spokesmen.

Lewis suffered numerous heart problems throughout his life; he revealed in the 2011 documentary Method to the Madness of Jerry Lewis that he suffered his first heart attack at age 34 while filming Cinderfella in 1960. In December 1982, at age 56, he suffered his second heart attack. Two months later, in February 1983, Lewis underwent open-heart double-bypass surgery. En route to San Diego from New York City on a cross-country commercial airline flight on June 11, 2006, Lewis suffered his third heart attack at age 80. It was discovered that he had pneumonia, as well as a severely damaged heart. He underwent a cardiac catheterization days after the heart attack, and two stents were inserted into one of his coronary arteries, which was 90 percent blocked. The surgery resulted in increased blood flow to his heart and allowed him to continue his rebound from earlier lung problems. Having the cardiac catheterization required him to cancel several major events from his schedule, but Lewis fully recuperated in a matter of weeks.

In 1999, Lewis's Australian tour was cut short when he had to be hospitalized in Darwin with viral meningitis. He was ill for more than five months. It was reported in the Australian press that he had failed to pay his medical bills. However, Lewis maintained that the payment confusion was the fault of his health insurer. The resulting negative publicity caused him to sue his insurer for US$100 million.

In addition to his decades-long heart problems, Lewis had prostate cancer, type 1 diabetes, and pulmonary fibrosis. In the late 1990s, Lewis was treated with prednisone for pulmonary fibrosis, which caused considerable weight gain and a startling change in his appearance. In September 2001, Lewis was unable to perform at a planned London charity event at the London Palladium. He was the headlining act, and was introduced, but did not appear onstage. He had suddenly become unwell, apparently with cardiac problems.

He was subsequently taken to a hospital. Some months thereafter, Lewis began an arduous, months-long therapy that weaned him off prednisone, and he lost much of the weight gained while on the drug. The treatment enabled him to return to work. On June 12, 2012, he was treated and released from a hospital after collapsing from hypoglycemia at a New York Friars Club event. This forced him to cancel a show in Sydney. In an October 2016 interview with Inside Edition, Lewis acknowledged that he might not star in anymore films, given his advanced age, while admitting, through tears, that he was afraid of dying, as it would leave his wife and daughter alone. In June 2017, Lewis was hospitalized at a Las Vegas hospital for a urinary tract infection.

Lewis died at his home in Las Vegas, Nevada, on August 20, 2017, at the age of 91. The cause was end-stage cardiac disease and peripheral artery disease. Lewis was cremated. In his will, Lewis left his estate to his second wife of 34 years, SanDee Pitnick, and their daughter, and explicitly disinherited his children from his first marriage and their children.

Comedic style
Lewis "single-handedly created a style of humor that was half anarchy, half excruciation. Even comics who never took a pratfall in their careers owe something to the self-deprecation Jerry introduced into American show business."  

Lewis's comedy style was physically uninhibited, expressive, and potentially volatile. He was known especially for his distinctive voice, facial expressions, pratfalls, and physical stunts. His improvisations and ad-libbing, especially in nightclubs and early television were revolutionary among performers. It was "marked by a raw, edgy energy that would distinguish him within the comedy landscape". Will Sloan, of Flavorwire wrote, "In the late '40s and early '50s, nobody had ever seen a comedian as wild as Jerry Lewis." Placed in the context of the conservative era, his antics were radical and liberating, paving the way for future comedians Steve Martin, Richard Pryor, Andy Kaufman, Paul Reubens, and Jim Carrey. Carrey wrote: "Through his comedy, Jerry would stretch the boundaries of reality so far that it was an act of anarchy ... I learned from Jerry", and "I am because he was".

Acting the bumbling 'everyman', Lewis used tightly choreographed, sophisticated sight gags, physical routines, verbal double-talk and malapropisms. "You cannot help but notice Lewis's incredible sense of control in regards to performing—they may have looked at times like the ravings of a madman but his best work had a genuine grace and finesse behind it that would put most comedic performers of any era to shame." They are "choreographed as exactly as any ballet, each movement and gesture coming on natural beats and conforming to the overall rhythmic form which is headed to a spectacular finale: absolute catastrophe."

Although Lewis made it no secret that he was Jewish, he was criticized for hiding his Jewish heritage. In several of his films — both with Martin and solo — Lewis's Jewish identity is hinted at in passing, and was never made a defining characteristic of his onscreen persona. Aside from the 1959 television movie The Jazz Singer and the unreleased 1972 film The Day the Clown Cried, Lewis never appeared in a film or film role that had any ties to his Jewish heritage. When asked about this lack of Jewish portrayal in a 1984 interview, Lewis stated, "I never hid it, but I wouldn't announce it and I wouldn't exploit it. Plus the fact it had no room in the visual direction I was taking in my work."

Lewis's physical movements in films received some criticism because he was perceived as imitating or mocking those with a physical disability. Through the years, the disability that has been attached to his comedic persona has not been physical, but mental. Neuroticism and schizophrenia have been a part of Lewis's persona since his partnership with Dean Martin; however, it was in his solo career that these disabilities became important to the plots of his films and the characters. In films such as The Ladies Man (1961), The Disorderly Orderly (1964), The Patsy (1964) and Cracking Up (1983), there is either neuroticism, schizophrenia, or both that drive the plot. Lewis was able to explore and dissect the psychological side of his persona, which provided a depth to the character and the films that was not present in his previous efforts.

Tributes and legacy
From the late 1940s to the mid-1960s, "Lewis was a major force in American popular culture." Widely acknowledged as a comic genius, Lewis influenced generations of comedians, comedy writers, performers and film makers. As Lewis was often referred to as the bridge from Vaudeville to modern comedy, Carl Reiner wrote after Lewis's death, "All comedians watch other comedians, and every generation of comedians going back to those who watched Jerry on the Colgate Comedy Hour were influenced by Jerry. They say that mankind goes back to the first guy ... which everyone tries to copy. In comedy that guy was Jerry Lewis."

Lewis's films, especially his self-directed films, have warranted steady reappraisal. Richard Brody of The New Yorker said Lewis was "one of the most original, inventive, ... profound directors of the time" and "one of the most skilled and original comic performers, verbal and physical, ever to appear on screen". Dave Kehr, a film critic and film curator for the Museum of Modern Art, wrote in The New York Times of Lewis's "fierce creativity" and "the extreme formal sophistication of his direction". Kehr wrote that Lewis was "one of the great American filmmakers".

"Lewis was an explosive experimenter with a dazzling skill, and an audacious, innovatory flair for the technique of the cinema. He knew how to frame and present his own adrenaline-fuelled, instinctive physical comedy for the camera."

Lewis was at the forefront in the transition to independent filmmaking, which came to be known as New Hollywood in the late 1960s. Writing for the Los Angeles Times in 2005, screenwriter David Weddle lauded Lewis's audacity in 1959 "daring to declare his independence from the studio system". Lewis came along to a studio system in which the industry was regularly stratified between players and coaches. The studios tightly controlled the process and they wanted their people directing. Yet Lewis regularly led, often flouting the power structure to do so.
Steven Zeitchik of the LA Times wrote of Lewis, "Control over material was smart business, and it was also good art. Neither the entrepreneur nor the auteur were common types among actors in mid-20th century Hollywood. But there Lewis was, at a time of strict studio control, doing both."

No other comedic star, with the exceptions of Chaplin and Keaton in the silent era, dared to direct himself. "Not only would Lewis's efforts as a director pave the way for the likes of Mel Brooks and Woody Allen, but it would reveal him to be uncommonly skilled in that area as well." "Most screen comedies until that time were not especially cinematic—they tended to plop down the camera where it could best capture the action and that was it. Lewis, on the other hand, was interested in exploring the possibilities of the medium by utilizing the tools he had at his disposal in formally innovative and oftentimes hilarious ways." "In Lewis's work the way the scene is photographed is an integral part of the joke. His purposeful selection of lenses, for example, expands and contracts space to generate laughs that aren't necessarily inherent in the material, and he often achieves his biggest effects via what he leaves off screen, not just visually but structurally."

As a director, Lewis advanced the genre of film comedy with innovations in the areas of fragmented narrative, experimental use of music and sound technology, and near surrealist use of color and art direction. This prompted his peer, filmmaker Jean Luc Godard to proclaim, "Jerry Lewis ... is the only one in Hollywood doing something different, the only one who isn't falling in with the established categories, the norms, the principles. ... Lewis is the only one today who's making courageous films. He's been able to do it because of his personal genius". Jim Hemphill for American Cinematheque wrote, "They are films of ambitious visual and narrative experimentation, provocative and sometimes conflicted commentaries on masculinity in post-war America, and unsettling self-critiques and analyses of the performer's neuroses."

Intensely personal and original, Lewis's films were groundbreaking in their use of dark humor for psychological exploration. Justin Chang of the Los Angeles Times said, "The idea of comedians getting under the skin and tapping into their deepest, darkest selves is no longer especially novel, but it was far from a universally accepted notion when Lewis first took the spotlight. Few comedians before him had so brazenly turned arrested development into art, or held up such a warped fun house mirror to American identity in its loudest, ugliest, vulgarest excesses. Fewer still had advanced the still-radical notion that comedy doesn't always have to be funny, just fearless, in order to strike a nerve".

Before 1960, Hollywood comedies were screwball or farce. Lewis, from his earliest 'home movies, such as How to Smuggle a Hernia Across the Border, made in his playhouse in the early 1950s, was one of the first to introduce satire as a full-length film. This "sharp-eyed" satire continued in his mature work, commenting on the cult of celebrity, the machinery of 'fame', and "the dilemma of being true to oneself while also fitting into polite society". Stephen Dalton in The Hollywood Reporter wrote, Lewis had "an agreeably bitter streak, offering self-lacerating insights into celebrity culture which now look strikingly modern. Even post-modern in places." Speaking of The King of Comedy, "More contemporary satirists like Garry Shandling, Steve Coogan and Ricky Gervais owe at least some of their self-deconstructing chops to Lewis's generously unappetizing turn in Scorsese's cult classic."

Lewis was an early master of deconstruction to enhance comedy. From the first Comedy Hours he exposed the artifice of on-stage performance by acknowledging the lens, sets, malfunctioning props, failed jokes, and tricks of production. As Jonathan Rosenbaum wrote: Lewis had "the impulse to deconstruct and even demolish the fictional "givens" of any particular sketch, including those that he might have dreamed up himself, a kind of perpetual auto-destruction that becomes an essential part of his filmmaking as he steadily gains more control over the writing and direction of his features." His self directed films abound in behind-the-scene reveals, demystifying movie-making. Daniel Fairfax writes in Deconstructing Jerry: Lewis as a Director, "Lewis deconstructs the very functioning of the joke itself". ... quoting Chris Fujiwara, "The Patsy is a film so radical that it makes comedy out of the situation of a comedian who isn't funny." The final scene of The Patsy is famous for revealing to the audience the movie as a movie, and Lewis as actor/director. Lewis wrote in The Total Filmmaker, his belief in breaking the fourth wall, actors looking directly into the camera, despite industry norms. 

Robert De Niro and Sandra Bernhard, both of whom starred with Lewis in The King of Comedy, reflected on his death. Bernhard said: "It was one of the great experiences of my career, he was tough but one of a kind". De Niro said: "Jerry was a pioneer in comedy and film. And he was a friend. I was fortunate to have seen him a few times over the past couple of years. Even at 91, he didn't miss a beat ... or a punchline. You'll be missed." There was also a New York Friars Club roast in honor of Lewis with Sarah Silverman and Amy Schumer. Martin Scorsese recalls working with him on The King of Comedy, "It was like watching a virtuoso pianist at the keyboard". Lewis was the subject of a documentary Jerry Lewis: Method to the Madness.

Peter Chelsom, director of Funny Bones wrote, "Working with him was a masterclass in comic acting – and in charm. From the outset he was generous." "There's a very thin line between a talent for being funny and being a great actor. Jerry Lewis epitomized that. Jerry embodied the term "funny bones": a way of differentiating between comedians who tell funny and those who are funny." Director Daniel Noah recalling his relationship with Lewis during production of Max Rose wrote, "He was kind and loving and patient and limitlessly generous with his genius. He was unbelievably complicated and shockingly self-aware."

Actor and comedian Jeffrey Tambor wrote after Lewis's death, "You invented the whole thing. Thank you doesn't even get close."

There have been numerous retrospectives of Lewis's films in the U.S. and abroad, most notably Jerry Lewis: A Film and Television Retrospective at Museum of the Moving Image, the 2013 Viennale, the 2016 Melbourne International Film Festival, The Innovator: Jerry Lewis at Paramount, at American Cinematheque in Los Angeles, and Happy Birthday Mr. Lewis: The Kid Turns 90, at MOMA.

In 2017, Lewis with others inaugurated and founded Legionnaires of Laughter and Legacy Awards, and the first Legacy Award  held in Downtown, New York. On August 21, 2017, multiple hotel marquees on the Las Vegas Strip honored Lewis with a coordinated video display of images of his career as a Las Vegas performer and resident. From 1949, as part of Martin and Lewis, and from 1956 as a solo, Lewis was a casino showroom headliner, playing numerous dates over the decades. Las Vegas was also the home of his annual Labor Day MDA telethon.

In popular culture
Between 1952 and 1971, DC Comics published a 124-issue comic book series with Lewis as one (later, the only) main protagonist, titled The Adventures of Dean Martin and Jerry Lewis. In The Simpsons, the character of Professor Frink is based on Lewis's Julius Kelp from The Nutty Professor. Lewis himself would later voice the character's father in the episode "Treehouse of Horror XIV". In Family Guy, Peter recreates Lewis's 'chairman of the board' scene from The Errand Boy. Comedian, actor and friend of Lewis, Martin Short, satirized him on the series SCTV in the sketches "The Nutty Lab Assistant", "Martin Scorsese presents Jerry Lewis Live on the Champs Elysees!", "The Tender Fella", and "Scenes From an Idiots Marriage", as well as on Saturday Night Lives "Celebrity Jeopardy!".

Also on SNL, the Martin and Lewis reunion on the 1976 MDA Telethon is reported by Chevy Chase on Weekend Update. Comedians Eddie Murphy and Joe Piscopo both parodied Lewis when he hosted SNL in 1983. Piscopo also channeled Jerry Lewis while performing as a 20th-century stand-up comedian in Star Trek: The Next Generation; in the second-season episode "The Outrageous Okona", Piscopo's Holodeck character, The Comic, tutors android Lieutenant Commander Data on humor and comedy. Comedian and actor Jim Carrey satirized Lewis on In Living Color in the sketch "Jheri's Kids Telethon". Carrey had an uncredited cameo playing Lewis in the series Buffalo Bill on the episode "Jerry Lewis Week". He also played Lewis, with impersonator Rich Little as Dean Martin, on stage. Actor Sean Hayes portrayed Lewis in the made-for-TV movie Martin and Lewis, with Jeremy Northam as Dean Martin. Actor Kevin Bacon plays the Lewis character in the 2005 film Where The Truth Lies, based on a fictionalized version of Martin and Lewis. In the satiric novel, Funny Men, about singer/wild comic double act, the character Sigmund "Ziggy" Blissman, is based on Lewis.

John Saleeby, writer for National Lampoon has a humor piece "Ten Things You Should Know About Jerry Lewis". In the animated cartoon Popeye's 20th Anniversary, Martin and Lewis are portrayed on the dais. The animated series Animaniacs satirized Lewis in several episodes. The voice and boyish, naive cartoon character SpongeBob SquarePants is partially based on Lewis, with particular inspiration from his film The Bellboy. In 1998, The MTV animated show Celebrity Deathmatch had a clay-animated fight to the death between Dean Martin and Lewis. In a 1975 re-issue of MAD Magazine the contents of Lewis's wallet is satirized in their on-going feature "Celebrities' Wallets".

Lewis, and Martin & Lewis, as himself or his films, have been referenced by directors and performers of differing genres spanning decades, including Andy Warhol's Soap Opera (1964), John Frankenheimer's I Walk the Line (1970), Francis Ford Coppola's The Godfather (1972), Randal Kleiser's  Grease (1978), Rainer Werner Fassbinder's In a Year of 13 Moons (1978), Robert Zemeckis's Back to the Future (1985), Quentin Tarantino's Four Rooms (1995), Martin Scorsese's Gangs of New York (2002), Hitchcock (2012), Ben Stiller's  The Secret Life of Walter Mitty (2013), Jay Roach's Trumbo (2015), The Comedians (2015), Baskets (2016) and The Marvelous Mrs. Maisel (2017, 2018).

Similarly, varied musicians have mentioned Lewis in song lyrics including, Ice Cube, The Dead Milkmen, Queen Latifah, and Frank Zappa. The hip hop music band Beastie Boys have an unreleased single "The Jerry Lewis", which they mention, and danced to, on stage in Asheville, North Carolina in 2009. In their film Paul's Boutique — A Visual Companion, clips from The Nutty Professor play to "The Sounds of Science". In 1986, the comedy radio show Dr. Demento aired a parody of "Rock Me Amadeus", "Rock Me Jerry Lewis".

Apple iOS 10 includes an auto-text emoji for 'professor' with a Lewis lookalike portrayal from The Nutty Professor.
The word "flaaaven!", with its many variations and rhymes, is a Lewis-ism often used as a misspoken word or a person's mis-pronounced name. In a 2016 episode of the podcast West Wing Weekly, Joshua Malina is heard saying "flaven" when trying to remember a character's correct last name. Lewis's signature catchphrase "Hey, Laaady!" is ubiquitously used by comedians and laypersons alike.

Sammy Petrillo bore a coincidental resemblance to Lewis, so much so that Lewis at first tried to catch and kill Petrillo's career by signing him to a talent contract and then not giving him any work. When that failed (as Petrillo was under 18 at the time), Lewis tried to blackball Petrillo by pressuring television outlets and then nightclubs, also threatening legal action after Petrillo used his Lewis impersonation in the film Bela Lugosi Meets a Brooklyn Gorilla.

Awards, nominations, and other honors

 1952 – Photoplay Award
 1952 – Primetime Emmy Award Nomination for Best Comedian or Comedienne
 1954 – Most Cooperative Actor, Golden Apple Award
 1958 – Golden Laurel Nomination for Top Male Star
 1959 – Golden Laurel Nomination for Top Male Star
 1960 – Golden Laurel Nomination for Top Male Star
 1960 – Two stars (one for film and one for television) on the Hollywood Walk of Fame
 1961 – Golden Laurel Nomination for Top Male Comedy Performance for Cinderfella
 1961 – Golden Laurel Nomination for Top Male Star
 1962 – Golden Laurel Nomination for Top Male Star
 1963 – Golden Laurel Nomination for Top Male Star
 1963 – Cahiers du Cinéma's Top 10 Film Award Nomination for Best Film for The Nutty Professor 
 1964 – Golden Laurel Nomination for Top Male Star 
 1965 – Golden Laurel, Special Award – Family Comedy King
 1965 –  Cahiers du Cinéma's Top 10 Film Award Nomination for Best Film for The Family Jewels
 1966 – Golden Laurel Nomination for Comedy Performance (Male) for Boeing Boeing 
 1966 – Golden Light Technical Achievement Award for his 'video assist'
 1966 – Golden Globe Nomination for Best Actor in a Comedy or Musical
 1966 – Fotogramas de Plata Best Foreign Performer 
 1967 – Cahiers du Cinéma's Top 10 Film Award Nomination for Best Film for The Big Mouth 
 1970 – Jerry Lewis Award for Outstanding achievement in being a "Person" and "Performer" for Which Way to the Front
 1970 – The Michael S. McLean Happy Birthday and Thank You Award for Which Way to the Front
 1977 – Nominated for a Nobel Peace Prize, for his work on behalf of the Muscular Dystrophy Association
 1978 – Greatest Public Service Benefiting the Disadvantaged, a Jefferson Awards annual award.
 1981 – Stinker Award Nomination for Worst Actor for Hardly Working
 1981 – Stinker Award Nomination for Worst Sense of Direction for Hardly Working   
 1983 – British Academy Film Awards (BAFTA) nomination for Best Actor in a Supporting Role for The King of Comedy
 1983 – Cahiers du Cinéma's Top 10 Film Award Nomination for Best Film for Cracking Up 
 1984 – Chevalier, Ordre national de la Légion d'honneur, France
 1985 – Razzie Award Nomination for Worst Actor for Slapstick (Of Another Kind)
 1991 – Comic Life Achievement Award
 1991 – Induction into the Broadcast Hall of Fame
 1991 – Lifetime Achievement Award, The Greater Fort Lauderdale Film Festival
 1992 – Induction into the International Humor Hall of Fame
 1995 – Theatre World Award, for Outstanding Broadway Debut for Damn Yankees
 1997 – American Comedy Awards Lifetime Achievement Award
 1999 – Golden Lion Honorary Award
 2002 – Rotary International Award of Honour
 2004 – Los Angeles Film Critics Association's Career Achievement Award
 2005 – Primetime Emmy Governor's Award
 2005 – Goldene Kamera Honorary Award
 2006 – Medal of the City of Paris, France
 2006 – Satellite Award for Outstanding Guest Star on Law and Order SVU
 2006 – Commandeur, Ordre national de la Légion d'honneur, France
 2009 – Induction into the New Jersey Hall of Fame
 2009 – Jean Hersholt Humanitarian Award at the 81st Academy Awards
 2009 – International Press Academy's Nikola Tesla Award in recognition of visionary achievements in filmmaking technology for his "video assist".
 2010 – Chapman University Honorary Doctorate of Humane Letters during the 2010 MDA Telethon
 2011 – Ellis Island Medal of Honor
 2013 – Homage from the Cannes Film Festival, with the screening of Lewis's latest film Max Rose
 2013 – Honorary Member of the Order of Australia (AM), for service to the Muscular Dystrophy Foundation of Australia and those affected by the disorder
 2014 – "Forecourt to the Stars" imprints at Grauman's Chinese Theatre in Hollywood
 2014 – New York Friars Club renames clubhouse building The Jerry Lewis Monastery
 2014 – Publicists Guild of America Lifetime Achievement Award 
 2015 – National Association of Broadcasters Distinguished Service Award 
 2015 – Casino Entertainment Legend Award

Filmography

Bibliography
  (ISBN is for the 2004 Mass Market Edition)

Documentaries
 Annett Wolf (Director) (1972) The World of Jerry Lewis (unreleased)
 Robert Benayoun (Director) (1982) Bonjour Monsieur Lewis (Hello Mr. Lewis)
 Burt Kearns (Director) (1989) Telethon (Released in US, 2014)
 Carole Langer (Director) (1996) Jerry Lewis: The Last American Clown
 Eckhart Schmidt (Director) (2006) König der Komödianten (King of Comedy)*
 Gregg Barson (Director) (2011). Method to the Madness of Jerry Lewis

Notes

References

Further reading
 
 
 
 
 
  Also, Film Quarterly, Vol. 48, No. 1 (Autumn, 1994), pp. 12–26 University of California Press
 
 
 
 
 
 
 
 
 Lamarca, Manuel (2017). Jerry Lewis. El día en el que el cómico filmó. Barcelona, Spain. Ediciones Carena.

Film criticism links
 Bright Lights Film Online Journal
 Film School Rejects
 la furia umana (Multilingual Film Quarterly)
  ‘jerrython’ at MUBI
 Museum of the Moving Image
 An American Original: The RogerEbert.com Staff Remembers Jerry Lewis
 Senses of Cinema

External links

 
 
 
 
 
 Jerry Lewis Interview video at Directors Guild of America
 Lewis interview video with Peter Bogdanovich Museum of the Moving Image Pinewood Dialogues
 Jerry Lewis Interview Podcast WTF with Marc Maron
 Drum Solo Battle (1955) with Buddy Rich at 

 
1926 births
2017 deaths
20th-century American comedians
20th-century American Jews
20th-century American male actors
20th-century American singers
21st-century American comedians
21st-century American Jews
21st-century American male actors
American film producers
American humanitarians
American male comedians
American male comedy actors
American male film actors
American male musical theatre actors
American male non-fiction writers
American male screenwriters
American male singer-songwriters
American male stage actors
American male television actors
American memoirists
American people of Russian-Jewish descent
American philanthropists
American television directors
Comedians from New Jersey
Comedy film directors
Commandeurs of the Légion d'honneur
Decca Records artists
Film directors from New Jersey
Film producers from New Jersey
Honorary Members of the Order of Australia
Irvington High School (New Jersey) alumni
Jean Hersholt Humanitarian Award winners
Jewish American male actors
Jewish American male comedians
Jewish American musicians
Jewish American writers
Jewish activists
Jewish singers
Las Vegas shows
Liberty Records artists
Male actors from New Jersey
Male actors from Newark, New Jersey
Musicians from Newark, New Jersey
New Jersey Hall of Fame inductees
Nightclub performers
Paramount Pictures contract players
People from Irvington, New Jersey
People with type 1 diabetes
Screenwriters from New Jersey
Singer-songwriters from New Jersey
Television producers from New Jersey
Traditional pop music singers
Vaudeville performers
Writers from Newark, New Jersey